Sergio Lozano Martínez (born 9 November 1988), commonly known as Sergio Lozano, is a Spanish futsal player who plays for Barcelona as an Ala. In 2020 he was awarded a spot in the 2020 FutsalFeed's Best Team of the Year Award.

Honours
6 Copa del Rey (2012, 2013, 2014, 2018, 2019, 2020) 
5 Spanish Futsal League (2011/12, 2012/13, 2018/19, 2020/21, 2021/22)
5 Copa de España (2012, 2013, 2019, 2020, 2022)
4 UEFA Futsal Cup (2011–12, 2013–14, 2019–20, 2021–22)
1 Euro (2012)
1 Campeonato de Europa sub-21 (2007)
1 Campeonato de España sub-21 (2007/08)
2 Campeonatos de España juveniles de selecciones territoriales (2005/06, 2006/07)
1 Best Team of the Year: Winger (2020)

References

External links
LNFS profile
RFEF profile
UEFA profile

1988 births
Living people
Futsal forwards
Spanish men's futsal players
FS Cartagena players
Caja Segovia FS players
FC Barcelona Futsal players
Sportspeople from Madrid